Emil Todorov Chuprenski (born 14 September, 1960 in Sofia) is a retired boxer from Bulgaria, who competed for his native country at the 1988 Summer Olympics in Seoul, South Korea. There he was defeated in the quarterfinals of the Men's Lightweight Division (– 60 kg) by USA's eventual bronze medalist Romallis Ellis.

References
 sports-reference

1960 births
Living people
Lightweight boxers
Olympic boxers of Bulgaria
Boxers at the 1988 Summer Olympics
Sportspeople from Sofia
Bulgarian male boxers
AIBA World Boxing Championships medalists